Gemi Tutuana (born 20 March 1982), commonly known as Jeff Tutuana, is a Congolese former professional footballer who played as a winger or striker. He spent most of his career in Israel and Cyprus. Between 2002 and 2004 he made three appearances for the DR Congo national team.

Career
Tutuana start playing football in a club called Japatra in the Congo. He played there from 1997 to 1999, then moved to a bigger football club called AS Vita Club, where he played from 2000 to 2002.

After that, he tried his luck in Belgium with one of his friends from Vita Club called Nsumbu Mazuwa, but the two did not pass the tests of the Belgian football clubs and had to use an offer that they had from Israel and were signed by Hapoel Haifa in 2003. They played together in Haifa from 2003 to 2005; during those years they won the Second Division and helped the team to reach the Israeli Premier League. However, after one season the team was relegated to the Second Division after finishing in last place.

Later he moved to Beitar Jerusalem who wanted him since the last season was over. He scored 4 goals in 19 games, suffered from a serious back injury and was released after one season and replaced by Spanish striker David Aganzo.

After being released he went to France to see his newborn daughter (his first child) and after he got his strength back he decided to train with the AS Saint-Étienne team. He then returned to Israel and was signed by F.C. Ashdod but almost was signed by AS Cannes, whose coach Luis Fernandez was the former coach of Beitar who had released Tutuana but wanted to see him plays for AS Cannes. He also played in Israel for Maccabi Netanya.

Tutuana then moved to Cyprus in 2006 and played for Enosis Neon Paralimni in the Cypriot First Division for two seasons. In 2009, he moved to Ayia Napa FC in the Cypriot Second Division and later to Olympiakos Nicosia.

Tutuana appeared for the DR Congo national team.

References

External links
 

1982 births
Living people
Association football forwards
Association football midfielders
Democratic Republic of the Congo footballers
Democratic Republic of the Congo international footballers
Olympiakos Nicosia players
AS Vita Club players
Hapoel Haifa F.C. players
Beitar Jerusalem F.C. players
F.C. Ashdod players
Maccabi Netanya F.C. players
Enosis Neon Paralimni FC players
Ayia Napa FC players
AEK Kouklia F.C. players
Liga Leumit players
Israeli Premier League players
Cypriot First Division players
Democratic Republic of the Congo expatriate footballers
Expatriate footballers in Israel
Expatriate footballers in Cyprus
Expatriate footballers in France
Democratic Republic of the Congo expatriate sportspeople in Israel
Democratic Republic of the Congo expatriate sportspeople in Cyprus
Democratic Republic of the Congo expatriate sportspeople in France
Footballers from Kinshasa
21st-century Democratic Republic of the Congo people